Turris trilirata is an extinct species of sea snail, a marine gastropod mollusk in the family Turridae, the turrids.

Description
Dimensions: length 10.5 mm; breadth 4 mm; length of the aperture 3-5 mm.

Original description:

Distribution
Fossils of this extinct species were found in Eocene strata in Victoria, Australia.

References

trilirata
Gastropods described in 1897
Gastropods of Australia